Joel Agee (born 1940 in New York City) is an American writer and translator. He lives in New York.

Early life 
Joel Agee is the son of the American author James Agee. After his parents divorced in 1941, he and his mother Alma Agee, née Mailman, went to live in Mexico where she met and married the expatriate German novelist Bodo Uhse. Agee's half-brother Stefan Uhse, born in Mexico in 1946, took his own life in 1973 in New York City. In 1948 the family moved to the Soviet sector of Berlin, where Uhse became editor in chief of the cultural magazine Aufbau, a member of the GDR-Volkskammer, and later chairman of the East German writers association. When her marriage failed in 1960, Alma Uhse relocated with her sons back to the United States.

Joel Agee grew up in a literary family, and at an early age was determined to become a writer. Having various times dropped out of school, he was to a certain degree self-educated. He married Susan Lemansky in 1966 and their daughter Gina was born in 1967. A small inheritance enabled him to travel around Europe for two and a half years with his wife and daughter in search of kindred souls interested in founding a commune. During this period, the late sixties and early seventies, he was drawn to Buddhism and used drugs, notably LSD. Briefly, before returning to the US, he spent time in an English prison after being busted for possession. Many of these experiences are recounted in his memoir In the House of My Fear.

Career 
Joel Agee began freelancing in the 1970s, and his essays began appearing in such prestigious magazines as The New Yorker. In 1980 he became a staff writer for Harper's Magazine and in the following year he was named fiction editor. He wrote the memoir Twelve Years – An American Boyhood in East Germany (1981), followed by In the House of My Fear (2004). He has translated works by Heinrich von Kleist, Friedrich Dürrenmatt, Elias Canetti, Rainer Maria Rilke, Gottfried Benn, Hans Erich Nossack, Jürg Federspiel, Aeschylus and others. He has contributed essays, stories, travel pieces and book reviews to The New Yorker, Harper's, The New York Times Book Review, and other national publications. In 2022 Melville House Books published Agee's first work of fiction, the novel The Stone World.

Works

Fiction 
 The Stone World. Melville House Books, Brooklyn, 2022.

Memoirs 
 Twelve Years: An American Boyhood in East Germany. Farrar, Straus and Giroux, New York 1981, republished by The University of Chicago Press, 2000.
 Zwölf Jahre – Eine amerikanische Jugend in Ostdeutschland. Hanser, München, 1982, (translated by Joel Agee and Lola Gruenthal), reprint (with a foreword and text comments) 2009.
 In the House of My Fear. Shoemaker & Hoard, Washington DC 2004.

Translations 
 Robert Musil: Agathe or, The Forgotten Sister. New York Review Books, New York 2019.
 Aeschylus: Prometheus Bound. New York Review Books Classics, New York 2015.
 Elias Canetti: The Secret Heart of the Clock: notes, aphorisms, fragments; 1973–1985. Farrar, Straus and Giroux, 1989.
 Friedrich Dürrenmatt: Selected writings.
 Volume 1. Plays. University of Chicago Press, Chicago 2006.
 Volume 2 Fictions. The University of Chicago Press, Chicago 2006.
 Volume 3: Essays. The University of Chicago Press, Chicago 2006.
 Friedrich Dürrenmatt: The Pledge. Boulevard (Mass Market), 2000.
 Friedrich Dürrenmatt, The Assignment: Or, On the Observing of the Observer of the Observers, Random House, 1988.* Cordelia Edvardson: Burned child seeks the fire: a memoir. Beacon Press, Boston 1997.
 Jürg Federspiel: The ballad of Typhoid Mary. Dutton, New York 1983.
 Heinrich von Kleist: Penthesilea. Harper Collins, New York 2000.
 Hans Erich Nossack: The End. Hamburg 1943, University of Chicago Press, London 2006.
 Rainer Maria Rilke: Letters on Cézanne, Fromm International Publishers, 1982; republished, with corrections and improvements and a translator's foreword, by North Point Press, 2002.
 Rainer Maria Rilke: Rilke and Benvenuta: an intimate correspondence, Fromm International Publishers, 1987.
 Karlo Štajner, Seven Thousand Days in Siberia, Farrar, Straus and Giroux, 1988.

Selected essays and articles 
 "The Calm Before the Storm" (review of Aharon Appelfeld's The Age of Wonders), The New York Times, December 27, 1981.
 "The Rhine Runs Through It," Travel and Leisure Aug. 1998.
 "By a Dead Lake" (review of Elfriede Jelinek's novel Greed), New York Times, April 15, 2007.
 "The Good German" (review of Günter Grass's memoir Peeling the Onion), The Washington Post, July 8, 2007.
 "A lie that tells the truth: Memoir and the art of memory," Harper's Magazine, Nov. 2007.
 "German lessons," archipelago, Volume 7, Number 1.
 "Killing a Turtle," archipelago, Volume 7, Number 1.
 "Foreword: The End, by Hans Erich Nossack," review, archipelago, Volume 8, Number 4.
 "Not found, not lost," Tricycle, Winter 2008.

Awards 
 Guggenheim Fellowship and a grant from the National Endowment for the Arts
 DAAD fellowship from the DAAD Artists-in-Berlin Program of the German Academic Exchange Service (1990–91)
 Helen and Kurt Wolff Prize for the translation of Heinrich von Kleist's Penthesilea (1999)
 The Modern Language Association’s Lois Roth Award for the translation of Hans Erich Nossack's Der Untergang (2004)
 The ALTA National Translation Award (2007)
 The Berlin Prize of the American Academy in Berlin (2008)
 Oxford-Weidenfeld Translation Prize finalist (2007)

References

Further reading 
 "James and Joel Agee: Like Father, Like Son?" 
 Zwei Väter aus zwei Welten. In: Berliner Zeitung, 26. Mai 2000
 Always Straight Ahead: a Memoir by Alma Neuman, Louisiana State University Press, 1993, memoir by the author's mother (third husband named Neuman) with valuable information about his life.
 "Joel Agee's Trip" 
 "Ware House Hosts Joel Agee"
 Suzanne Munshower, "Top 10 Books About the Berlin Wall" in The Guardian, August 25, 2009. 
 "An Interview with Joel Agee" in Compulsive Reader, January 16, 2022.

External links 
 Bio from New York Review Books page 
 Poets & Writers 
 
 Website of Joel Agee
 Entry for Joel Agee in Perlentaucher 
 Leseprobe (PDF; 549 kB) from Zwölf Jahre – Eine amerikanische Jugend in Ostdeutschland (2009) on the site of Carl Hanser Verlags

20th-century American male writers
21st-century American male writers
American autobiographers
American translators
Writers from New York City
1940 births
Living people
20th-century American essayists
21st-century American essayists
American male essayists
American expatriates in Mexico